Irma Huerta (born August 19, 1969) is a former female freestyle swimmer from Mexico. She participated at the 1984 Summer Olympics for her native country. Her best result in Los Angeles, California was the 11th place in the Women's 4 × 100 m Freestyle Relay, alongside Patricia Kohlmann, Teresa Rivera and Rosa Fuentes.

References
Profile

1969 births
Living people
Mexican female freestyle swimmers
Swimmers at the 1983 Pan American Games
Swimmers at the 1984 Summer Olympics
Olympic swimmers of Mexico
Pan American Games bronze medalists for Mexico
Pan American Games medalists in swimming
Medalists at the 1983 Pan American Games
21st-century Mexican women
20th-century Mexican women